Serbian Venezuelan is a Venezuelan citizen of Serbian descent or Serbia-born person who resides in Venezuela.

The Serbian population settled in the country consisted mainly of political emigrants, that arrived at Venezuela after the Second World War, due to disagreements with the then Yugoslav communist regime. The estimated population of Serbs-Venezuelans range between 1,000 - 2,000.

In 1955, they founded the Serbian Orthodox Christian Community in Caracas. Later they built the Serbian Orthodox Church in 1966, where the consecration was attended by King Peter II of Yugoslavia. The Serbian Social Club of Aragua state was founded in 1965 by a group of immigrants arrived in the country from Yugoslavia in order to preserve and promote the customs, religion, culture and folklore of Serbia, with all the community based in the country without distinction of race or creed, sharing in the same space with the activities of the St. John the Baptist Church which belongs to the newly founded Serbian Orthodox Eparchy of Buenos Aires and South America.

Notable people
 Vladica Popović (born 1935) – Serbian-Venezuelan football manager and former footballer. 
 Miguel Socolovich (born 1986) – Venezuelan baseball player.
 Veruska Ljubisavljević (born 1991) – Venezuelan model and beauty pageant titleholder.

See also
 Croatian Venezuelan
 European Venezuelan
 Immigration to Venezuela

References

External links
Serbs in South America
 Serbia Iglesia Ortodoxa en Venezuela-Српска Православна Црква у Венецуели
Club Serbio de Aragua

 
Serbian diaspora
European Venezuelan
Ethnic groups in Venezuela